Atinggola is a small town and district in Gorontalo Regency in Gorontalo, northern Sulawesi, Indonesia. It is located on the Celebes Sea. In 1981 the district had a population of around 15,000 Bolango people. The people speak a local dialect of the Bolango language, called the Atinggola language.

References

Populated places in Gorontalo (province)
Districts of Gorontalo (province)